Hani Amamou (born 16 September 1997) is a Tunisian professional footballer who plays as a defender for Espérance de Tunis.

References

External links
 

1997 births
Living people
Tunisian footballers
Association football defenders
Tunisia international footballers
CS Sfaxien players
Espérance Sportive de Tunis players